David Friedman may refer to:

Music
 David Friedman (percussionist) (born 1944), American jazz musician (vibes, marimba)
 David Friedman (composer) (born 1950), Broadway and film composer

Film
 David Friedman (actor) (born 1973), American film and TV actor and child star of the 1980s
 David F. Friedman (1923–2011), American filmmaker (exploitation films)

Writers
 David Friedman, the birth name of David Benioff (born 1970), American screenwriter
 Dafydd ab Hugh (David Friedman, born 1960), science fiction/fantasy writer; political weblogger
 David D. Friedman (born 1945), anarcho-capitalist writer, economist, and medieval reenactor
 David Friedman (poet), American poet

Law
 David Friedman (judge), American judge in New York
 David M. Friedman, American former bankruptcy lawyer and diplomat, US Ambassador to Israel from 2017 to 2021.

See also
 Friedman
 David Freedman (disambiguation)
 David Freeman (disambiguation)